The ancient Egyptian Game piece (hieroglyph), also a Token, or the general term for any gaming-gambling piece, Draughtsman is an ancient hieroglyph. Gaming pieces were certainly required in predynastic times, as the cultural creation of games and entertainment has a long history in most cultures. An ivory-piece lion is known from the Old Kingdom of ancient Egypt; the set contains three lions, and three dog tokens of ivory.

The Senet is recorded as the oldest boardgame in history, for which tokens are used.

Use of the "game piece" hieroglyph

The basic word for "Game piece" or "Draughtsman" is "ab". By implication, people on a flat arena were moving like "pieces" (from a distance), and numerous varieties of the word 'to dance' include varieties using the "Game piece", as a determinative; two examples are shown: the word 'draughtsman', and 'to dance'-(the plural of "ab", "abU"-(U being the language plural-but also the "quail chick (hieroglyph)" in Ancient Egypt).

Iconographic use

The most common use of the "Gaming piece" as an artefact of ancient Egypt, would be the use with the game of Senet. The Senet game was often put into tombs and grave sites, as part of the grave goods; the games were part of the pastimes for the afterlife, including any other common 'hobbies' of the deceased–(for example hunting ducks at the marsh using a throwstick). Since board games represent the common man's activities, the Senet game has numerous examples from Ancient Egypt; this also includes the reliefs shown on temple walls, of individuals enjoying their activities in the afterlife.

Example "gaming tokens"
Some example game pieces of ancient Egypt. One of the more famous games was "Hounds and Jackals", a race game, with far less artefacts found of the game.

See also
Gardiner's Sign List#Y. Writings, Games, Music
List of Egyptian hieroglyphs

External links

Senet, with game tokens:
13-piece game token set, Senet game

References

Budge, 1920, (1978). An Egyptian Hieroglyphic Dictionary, E.A.Wallace Budge, (Dover Publications), c 1978, (c 1920), Dover edition, 1978. (In two volumes) (softcover)
Schulz, Seidel, 1998. Egypt: The World of the Pharaohs, Editors, Regine Schulz, Matthias Seidel, Könemann Verlagsgesellschaft mbH, Cologne, English translation version. (hardcover)

Egyptian hieroglyphs: writings-games-music